Howard Lawrence Lachtman (born July 8, 1941) is an American academic, literary critic, editor and author, who has written extensively on the life and works of Jack London, Arthur Conan Doyle, and on crime fiction as a whole.

Early life and career 
Born in San Francisco on July 8, 1941, to George Lachtman and Florence Katz, Howard attended Lowell High School, UC Berkeley and UC Hastings Law, and obtained his M.A and Ph.D. from University of the Pacific.

Assessing Lachtman's contribution to a 1979 collection of London's own essays entitled Jack London: No Mentor But Myself, Los Angeles Times critic Sal Noto states:

Reviewing Lachtman's 1982 anthology, Sporting Blood: Jack London's Greatest Sports Writing, the El Paso Herald-Post's David Innes notes that the book "could serve as a pattern for what a good theme anthology should be," adding that "Lachtman's introductory essay is a fine one, as are his short, scene-setting paragraphs." Regarding the 1984 collection, Young Wolf: The Early Adventure Stories of Jack London, El Paso Times critic Dale L. Walker writes:

Writing two years later in the same paper, Walker calls Lachtman's Sherlock Slept Here a "superb and authoritative little study [of] Arthur Conan Doyle's debt to the United States," commending in particular Lachtman's "thoroughly fascinating analysis of that most American of Holmes stories, 'The Adventure of the Noble Bachelor'."

Lachtman also reviewed books—primarily mysteries—for the Los Angeles Times between 1976 and 1981, and, from 1977 to 1986, for the San Francisco Examiner.

A decidedly unimposing fictional character named Howard Lachtman, who happens to be at least the nominal leader of a small group of Sherlock Holmes devotees, figures prominently in Chapter II of Stuart Kaminsky's 1983 detective novel He Done Her Wrong.

Works

Books
 Sporting Blood: Selections from Jack London's greatest sports writing. Novato, CA : Presidio Press. 1981 .
 Young Wolf: The Early Adventure Stories of Jack London. Santa Barbara, CA : Capra Press. 1984. .
 Sherlock Slept Here ; being a brief history of the singular adventures of Sir Arthur Conan Doyle in America, with some observations upon the exploits of Mr. Sherlock Holmes. Santa Barbara, CA : Capra Press. 1985. .

Essays
  "Man and Superwoman in Jack London's 'The Kanaka Surf'"].] Western American Literature. Summer 1972. Vol. VII, No. 2, pp. 101–110* "All That Glitters: Jack London's Gold". Jack London Newsletter. September–December, 1972. pp. 172–175, 196–178.
 "Doyle in Dreamland: The education of an eminent Victorian". The Los Angeles Times. October 30, 1977. Sec. Reviews, pp. 3, 20.
 "The Nine Lives of Jack London". The San Francisco Examiner. November 6, 1977.
 "Oscar in California: A Wilde West Show". The Los Angeles Times. September 24, 1978.
 "Willard Wright's Philo Vance: A Dandy in Acid". Los Angeles Times. June 3, 1979. Sec. Reviews, pp. 3, 25. 
 "Mysterious Case of the Gardner-Chandler Friendship". The Los Angeles Times. January 4, 1981.
"When Jack London Answered the Call of the Orange Blossoms". The Los Angeles Times. March 30, 1981. Sec. Reviews, pg. 3.

Poetry
 "Losses for Review" (1970)
 "Three Poems: Fat City, The River Merchant to His Wife: A Letter, News from Thermopylae" (1972)
 "Elegy for William Claude Dunkenfield (W. C. Fields)" (1972)
 "Handiwork" (2021)
 "Sentry" (2021)

Notes

References

Further reading
 "Prize-Winning Poets". Concord Transcript. April 25, 1968.
 Lachtman, Howard (January 7, 2011). "Poet Laureate". The Record.
 Gilbert, Lori (January 11, 2019). "Photographer's new magazine tells stories of the Delta". The Stockton Record.

External links
 Howard Lachtman at WorldCat
 Howard Lachtman at SoundingsMag.net

1941 births
American writers
American literary critics
Living people
Los Angeles Times people
San Francisco Examiner people
University of California, Hastings College of the Law alumni
University of the Pacific (United States) alumni
University of the Pacific (United States) faculty
Writers from San Francisco